Cladosictis is an extinct genus of South American metatherian from Patagonia, Argentina (Chichinales, Cerro Bandera, Sarmiento and Santa Cruz Formations) and Chile (Río Frias Formation).

Description 

With sharp canines and slicing carnassials, Cladosictis's teeth were similar to those of carnivorans, although the groups were unrelated.

References

External links

Sparassodonts
Miocene mammals of South America
Colhuehuapian
Santacrucian
Friasian
Neogene Argentina
Fossils of Argentina
Neogene Chile
Fossils of Chile
Fossil taxa described in 1887
Taxa named by Florentino Ameghino
Prehistoric mammal genera
Neuquén Basin
Cerro Bandera Formation
Chichinales Formation
Golfo San Jorge Basin
Sarmiento Formation
Austral or Magallanes Basin
Santa Cruz Formation